Microids (formerly Microïds) is a French video game developer and publisher based in Paris. Founded in 1985 by Elliot Grassiano, it attained early success with games published through Loriciel in France and other partners (including Activision and Broderbund) in international markets. Through expanding its staff and development teams, Microïds generated funds to expand from just development to publishing and distribution and opening international offices. The company merged with MC2 in 2003 to create MC2-Microïds, whereafter it acquired publishers Wanadoo Edition and Cryo Interactive. Grassiano left MC2-Microïds in 2005; under new management, MC2-Microïds was briefly renamed MC2 before returning to the old Microïds name. It was then acquired by Anuman Interactive in 2010, which itself was renamed Microïds (then simplified to Microids) in 2019.

History

Background and early years (1985–2003) 
Microïds was founded by Elliot Grassiano, a French programmer. He was educated at the Lycée Louis-le-Grand school from 1972 to 1974 and later studied engineering, electronics, and computers at the École nationale supérieure d'arts et métiers. He started working as an engineer for the defence system company SAGEM in 1979. By the 1980s, Grassiano had become interested in telecommunications, consumer electronics, and video games. He acquired a Thomson MO5-model home computer, which he used to create his first game, Space Shuttle Simulator. The game was published by Loriciel and released to both critical and commercial success. Subsequently, Grassiano quit his job to establish his own company. He formally founded Microïds in 1985, setting it up in Vélizy-Villacoublay, a suburb of Paris. He was aided in these efforts by Loriciel's founders, Laurent Weill and Marc Bayle, as well as Patrick Le Nestour, another engineer. The name "Microïds" was a portmanteau of "microinformatique" ("micro-informatics") and "androids". Within its first year of operation, the company grew to five people, with Grassiano in the managerial role.

Initially, Microïds set out to create consumer robotics projects before shifting its focus solely to video games. The first Microïds-developed game was Air Attack, released by Loriciel for the Thomson MO5 to moderate commercial success. Early adventure games developed by Microïds include Oceania (developed by Le Nestour and released in 1985 for the Thomson MO5 and TO7) and Les Pyramides D'Atlantys (developed by Luc Thibaud and released for the Amstrad CPC in 1986). Air Attack provided the groundwork for subsequent Microïds games, such as 500 cc Grand Prix for the Amstrad CPC, which debuted in 1986. This game was the company's first breakthrough title, partially driven by the CPC's success in France. By way of a deal between Loriciel and Activision, the game was also released in the UK, it was also released in the US, and it was later ported to other systems, such as the Atari ST. The American market appeared especially viable for Microïds, who believed that game sales would vastly outnumber the domestic ones. For this reason, it partnered with the American publisher Broderbund in 1987, which released several Microïds games in the country, partially under altered names. In return, Microïds managed sales of Broderbund's games, notably Prince of Persia and Karateka in France.

Throughout the 1990s, Microïds underwent expansion, increasing both staff count and development team sizes. Development operations were accelerated to output more games, leading to increased profits. Through the new-earned funds, the company commenced operations in both video game publishing and distribution in 1995, and between then and 1997 opened three international subsidiaries: Microïds Italia in Milan, Microïds UK in Milton Keynes, and Microïds Canada in Montreal. By 1997, Microïds had 20 employees and a turnover of 20 million French francs. Both increased tenfold by 2002, and the Canadian studio alone house 105 of Microïds' 200 employees by 2003.

Later years (2003–present) 
In 2003, Microïds merged with MC2, a French software company, with the amalgam assuming the name MC2-Microïds. In September that year, it acquired Wanadoo Edition, the games division of Wanadoo, which itself had been created through a September 2000 merger between Index+ and France Telecom Multimedia in exchange, Wanadoo received a 12% stake in MC2-Microïds. In 2004, MC2-Microïds proceeded to close Microïds UK, while Microïds Italia spun off as Blue Label Entertainment. Microïds Canada was sold off to Ubisoft in March 2005, with the studio's 50 employees integrated into Ubisoft's own Ubisoft Montreal studio. Later that year, Grassiano left MC2-Microïds due to internal disagreements. He was succeeded by Index+ founder Emmanuel Olivier, who was named chief executive officer (CEO). With this management change, MC2-Microïds shortened its name to just "MC2". This decision was reversed in November 2007, when it returned to the original "Microïds" name. In 2008, Microïds further acquired the assets and intellectual property of bankrupt publisher Cryo Interactive.

In 2009, the publisher Anuman Interactive, while in the process of being acquired by Média-Participations, began looking for possible acquisitions of its own. That November, the company announced its intent to acquire Microïds. The acquisition was completed on 1 January 2010, after which Microïds continued operating as a division of Anuman. Alongside the acquisition, Olivier left the company. A sub-label for non-adventure games, Microïds Games for All, was launched the same year. In 2013, Grassiano joined Anuman and became the vice-president for Microïds. Additionally, an indie game label, Microïds Indie, was opened in September 2016. In July 2019, the Microïds label name was simplified to "Microids". That October, Microids announced that Anuman would be renamed "Microids", with Anuman CEO Stéphane Longeard becoming the CEO of Microids, co-managing it with Grassiano. Microids also opened a Japanese office run by Martial Meyssignac and Yves Bléhaut, and strengthened the Microids Indie label with a dedicated team managed by Vincent Dondaine. A distribution arm, Microids Distribution France, was established in December 2020.

Investments

Games

References

External links 
 

French companies established in 1985
Companies based in Paris
Video game companies established in 1985
Video game companies of France
Video game development companies
Video game publishers
2010 mergers and acquisitions